PawnHero is the first online pawnshop in Southeast Asia that aims to solve the problem of expensive credit for base-of-the-pyramid consumers in emerging markets. It was first launched in the Philippines in February 2015 to meet the quick loan needs of the country. Recent studies have shown that only two out of 10 Filipinos have bank accounts and less than five percent have credit cards. PawnHero accepts a wide range of pawnable items that include jewelry, luxury goods, electronics, home equipment, and other personal items as collateral for a secured loan.

About PawnHero

Philippine launch
PawnHero first launched in the Philippines as PawnHero.ph, an online pawning and selling website managed by PawnHero Pawnshop Philippines Inc. It leveraged on the large smartphone user population in the Philippines by allowing the use of a smartphone to pawn items. PawnHero is a licensed pawnbroker registered with the Bangko Sentral ng Pilipinas.

Board of Directors 
PawnHero was founded by David Margendorff, Nix Nolledo, and Manny Ayala.

Funding 
PawnHero received strategic seed funding from Sulficio Tagud, CEO of 2GO, the biggest premier logistics company in the Philippines. In addition, PawnHero also received funding from 500 Startups, IMJ Investment Partners, Kaikaku Fund (Softbank and Alibaba), and angel investors such as Paul V. Rivera.

Awards
In March 2015, PawnHero won Judge's Choice in the Top 100 Startups Philippine Qualifiers for Echelon Asia Summit 2015. Three months later, it won the Judge's Choice Award as the Most Promising Startup in Asia at Echelon Asia Summit 2015 in Singapore.

References

Online retailers of the Philippines
Philippine companies established in 2015
Financial services companies established in 2015
Retail companies established in 2015
Internet properties established in 2015
Pawn shops
2015 establishments in the Philippines